
Year 299 BC was a year of the pre-Julian Roman calendar. At the time it was known as the Year of the Consulship of Paetinus and Torquatus/Corvus (or, less frequently, year 455 Ab urbe condita). The denomination 299 BC for this year has been used since the early medieval period, when the Anno Domini calendar era became the prevalent method in Europe for naming years.

Events 
 By place 
 Roman Republic 
 The consul Marcus Fulvius Paetinus sacks the Umbrian city of Nequinum, which Rome had been besieging since the previous year.
 Third Samnite War:
 A coalition of raiders from Cisalpine and Transalpine Gaul invade Etruria and are paid off by the Etruscans. 
 Rome accuses the Etruscans of seeking to ally with the Gauls against Rome, and the consul Marcus Valerius Corvus ravages Etruria, destroying villages in an attempt to provoke the Etruscans into battle.
 The Samnites invade Lucania after the latter refuses to join them in alliance. The Lucanians suffer several defeats and lose multiple towns.

 China 
 The State of Qin annexes eight cities of the state of Chu. Chu then sends an envoy to ask the King of Huai to go to Qin to negotiate peace. Qu Yuan risks his life to go up to the court to persuade the King of Huai not to go to the negotiation.
 The State of Zhao annexes the State of Zhongshan.
 King Wuling of Zhao abdicates the throne of Zhao to his son.

Births

Deaths 
 Titus Manlius Torquatus, Roman consul

References